This is a list of woodcarvers - notable people who are known for their working wood by means of a cutting tool (knife) in one hand or a chisel by two hands or with one hand on a chisel and one hand on a mallet, resulting in a wooden figure or figurine, or in the sculptural ornamentation of a wooden object.
This list is incomplete. You can help by expanding it.



A
Fritz Abplanalp (1907-1982)
Alma Allen
Gene Amondson (1943-2009)
H. S. "Andy" Anderson (1893-1960)
Wepiha Apanui
John Wormald Appleyard (1831-1894)

B
Joseph A. Bailly
Magnus Berg
Leslie Garland Bolling
Lancelot Bryan

C
Dudley C. Carter
Wendell Castle
Walter Channing Jr.
Johann Joseph Christian
Jack Coutu
A. Elmer Crowell
Cherie Currie

D
Giovanni Angelo Del Maino
Delbert Daisey
Beau Dick
Axel Petersson Döderhultarn
Patrick Damiaens

E
Henning Engelsen
Harold Enlow

F
Lukman Alade Fakeye
Jim Flora
Jozef Fojtik (1960-)
William H. Fry

G
Edward Gallenstein
John Geldersma
Wendell Gilley
Grinling Gibbons
Alexander Grabovetskiy
Félix Granda
Ignaz Günther
Grinling Gibbons

H
Ben Harms
John Hemings
Claude Raguet Hirst
Bror Hjorth
Albert Hoffman
Hans Holst
Advent Hunstone
 Chris Hammack

J
Antoine Jacson
Emil Janel
Kåre Jonsborg
Lorentz Jørgensen

K
Marv Kaisersatt
Johannes Kirchmayer
Glisha Kostovski
Jacob Kremberg

L
Armand LaMontagne
Ron Lane
Alois Lang
Walter Langcake (1889-1967)
Po Shun Leong (1941-)
Jan van Lokeren
Mark Lindquist
Mel Lindquist
Robert Longhurst
Charles I. D. Looff
George López

M
Andrew Mansioun
Samuel McIntire
Juan Martínez Montañés
Josef Moriggl
Kate Mosher
Matt Moulthrop
Philip Moulthrop
Sarah Ann McMurray

N
Aaron Nelson-Moody
Tamati Ngakaho

O
Calle Örnemark

P
Park Chan-su (1949-)
Marko Penov
Irvan Perez
David E. Pergrin
Te Waaka Perohuka
Oscar W. Peterson
Walter J. Phillips
Elijah Pierce (1892-1984)
Lars Pinnerud
Pinwill sisters (born 1870s), English woodcarvers
Susan Point
Piri Poutapu
Hori Pukehika
Alexander Pope, Jr.
Don Potter

R
William Jesse Ramey
James Rattee
Harley Refsal
Remèr
Tilman Riemenschneider
Jørgen Ringnis
Raharuhi Rukupo

S
Abel Schrøder
Pat Scott
Emil Seidel
Hans Seyffer
Bob Spear
Johannes Stenrat
Dave Stetson
Johann Gustav Stockenberg
Veit Stoss

T
Hone Taiapa
Frederick William Tod
Edgar Tolson
 John O. Torell
Carl Johan Trygg
Carl Olof Trygg
Lars Trygg
Nils Trygg

V

 Peter Van Dievoet

W

Ignaz Waibl
Lemuel & Steven Ward
Werburgh Welch
Ben Wilson
Tom Wolfe

Z
Fred Zavadil
Gene Zesch (1863-1949)

See also
List of sculptors
List of people by occupation
Woodcarving

References

Indigenous woodcarvers of the Americas
 List of woodcarvers
Woodcarvers